Semiha Berksoy (24 May 1910 – 15 August 2004) was a Turkish opera singer and painter.

Early life
Semiha Berksoy was born in Çengelköy, Istanbul. Her mother was a painter. Semiha studied music and the visual arts at Istanbul Conservatory.

Career
Berksoy started her acting career with the role of Semiha in the first Turkish sound movie İstanbul Sokaklarında directed by Muhsin Ertuğrul in 1931.  She was cast in operettas in Istanbul theaters early in her career. She sang in the first Turkish opera Özsoy in 1934 (commissioned by Kemal Atatürk, composed by Adnan Saygun). She was honoured as the First Turkish Opera Singer and awarded with the opportunity to go to Berlin Music Academy for further training. She started her international singing career in 1934, performing in Turkey, Germany and Portugal, becoming known as a Wagnerian soprano. In 1939, for the 75th birthday of Richard Strauss in Berlin, she sang the role of Ariadne in Ariadne auf Naxos, becoming the first Turkish prima donna to perform on stage in Europe. Back in Turkey, she worked with Carl Ebert helping him in his efforts to create the Turkish State Opera and Ballet. This initiative lead to the creation of the Experimental Stage of the Ankara State Conservatory 1940.

She retired from the Istanbul Opera in 1972. She was decorated with the "Atatürk Opera Award" at the 50th anniversary ceremonies commemorating the introduction of women's rights to vote and to be elected. She received the title of "State Artist" in Turkey in 1998. Following her retirement, she remained active mostly as a theater artist.

Four years before her death, at the age of 90, she appeared in a dramatic scene singing Liebestod in Robert Wilson's opera The Days Before: Death, Destruction and Detroit III at the Lincoln Center in New York City (1999).

She died in Istanbul at the age of 94 due to complications related with heart surgery. She is survived by her daughter, Zeliha Berksoy.

Tribute
On 24 May 2019, on Berksoy’s 109th birthday, she was honored with a Google Doodle.

Filmography
 İstanbul Sokaklarında ("In the Streets of Istanbul"), (1931)
 Söz Bir, Allah Bir, (1933)
 Büyük Sır ("The Big Secret"), (1956)
 Karanlık Sular ("The Serpent's Tale"), (1993)
 Boulevard Bio, (2002)

See also
Turkish State Opera and Ballet

References

External links
 Semiha Berksoy Official Website
 
 Semiha Berksoy Opera Foundation Official Website

1910 births
2004 deaths
Singers from Istanbul
20th-century Turkish women opera singers